The Court of Justice of the European Union (CJEU) ( or "CJUE"; Latin: Curia) is the judicial branch of the European Union (EU). Seated in the Kirchberg quarter of Luxembourg City, Luxembourg, this EU institution consists of two separate courts: the Court of Justice and the General Court. From 2005 to 2016 it also contained the Civil Service Tribunal. It has a sui generis court system, meaning ’of its own kind’, and is a supranational institution.

The CJEU is the chief judicial authority of the European Union and oversees the uniform application and interpretation of European Union law, in co-operation with the national judiciary of the member states. The CJEU also resolves legal disputes between national governments and EU institutions, and may take action against EU institutions on behalf of individuals, companies or organisations whose rights have been infringed.

Composition

The CJEU consists of two major courts:
 the Court of Justice, informally known as European Court of Justice (ECJ), which hears applications from national courts for preliminary rulings, annulment and appeals. It consists of one judge from each EU member country, as well as 11 advocates general.
 the General Court, which hears applications for annulment from individuals, companies and, less commonly, national governments (focusing on competition law, state aid, trade, agriculture and trade marks). Since 2020 the court is composed of 54 judges, though only 49 seats are currently filled.

Functions

The CJEU's specific mission is to ensure that "the law is observed" "in the interpretation and application" of the Treaties of the European Union.  To achieve this, it:
 reviews the legality of actions taken by the EU's institutions;
 enforces compliance by member states with their obligations under the Treaties, and
 interprets European Union law.

History
The CJEU was originally established in 1952 as a single court called the Court of Justice of the European Coal and Steel Communities (as of 1958 the Court of Justice of the European Communities (CJEC)).

The General Court was created in 1988 (known as the Court of First Instance) and the Civil Service Tribunal was created in 2004.

With the entry into force of the Treaty of Lisbon in 2009, the court system obtained its current name (Court of Justice of the European Union), while the original court itself (the former CJEC) was renamed "Court of Justice".

The working language of the Court of Justice of the European Union is French.

See also
 Primacy of European Union law
 European Parliament in Luxembourg

Notes

References

Further reading 
Beck, Gunnar (2013). The Legal Reasoning of the Court of Justice of the EU. Oxford: Hart Publishing.
Mikelsone, Gundega (2013). The Binding Force of the Case Law of the Court of Justice of the European Union. .

External links

 Official website
 Access to documents of the Court of Justice of the EU on EUR-Lex
 The archival fonds of the Court of Justice of the European Union is consultable at the Historical Archives of the European Union

 
European Union law
Institutions of the European Union
2009 establishments in the European Union
European Union